Clunn is a Scottish surname, relating to Clunie in Perthshire.Notable people with this name include:

Harold Clunn (1879–1956), British shipping agent and non-fiction author
Rick Clunn (born 1946), American competitive bass fisherman
Tony Clunn (1946–2014), British army major and archaeologist

See also
Clune (disambiguation)

References

Scottish surnames